The women's 200 metre freestyle competition of the swimming events at the 1959 Pan American Games took place on 31 August (preliminaires) and 3 September (finals). The last Pan American Games champion was Wanda Werner of US.

This race consisted of four lengths of the pool, all in freestyle.

Results
All times are in minutes and seconds.

Heats
The first round was held on August 31.

Final 
The final was held on September 3.

References

Swimming at the 1959 Pan American Games
Pan